Sereno del Mar (Spanish for "Serene of the Sea") is a census-designated place (CDP) in Sonoma County, California. The 2020 United States census reported Sereno del Mar's population was 107.

Geography
According to the United States Census Bureau, the CDP covers an area of 0.7 square miles (1.9 km), all of it land.

Demographics
The 2010 United States Census reported that Sereno del Mar had a population of 126. The racial makeup of Sereno del Mar was 118 (93.7%) White, 1 (0.8%) African American, 1 (0.8%) Asian, 1 (0.8%) Pacific Islander, 2 (1.6%) from other races, and 3 (2.4%) from two or more races. Hispanic or Latino of any race were 8 persons (6.3%).

The Census reported that 100% of the population lived in households.

There were 63 households, out of which 6 (9.5%) had children under the age of 18 living in them, 33 (52.4%) were opposite-sex married couples living together, 3 (4.8%) had a female householder with no husband present, 1 (1.6%) had a male householder with no wife present.  There were 5 (7.9%) unmarried opposite-sex partnerships, and 5 (7.9%) same-sex married couples or partnerships. 15 households (23.8%) were made up of individuals, and 7 (11.1%) had someone living alone who was 65 years of age or older. The average household size was 2.00.  There were 37 families (58.7% of all households); the average family size was 2.32.

The population was spread out, with 9 people (7.1%) under the age of 18, 4 people (3.2%) aged 18 to 24, 22 people (17.5%) aged 25 to 44, 45 people (35.7%) aged 45 to 64, and 46 people (36.5%) who were 65 years of age or older.  The median age was 59.3 years. For every 100 females, there were 100.0 males.  For every 100 females age 18 and over, there were 91.8 males.

The homeowner vacancy rate was 3.6%; the rental vacancy rate was 18.2%. 85.7% of the population lived in owner-occupied housing units and 14.3% lived in rental housing units.

References

Census-designated places in Sonoma County, California
Census-designated places in California